Nowakowski (feminine: Nowakowska; plural: Nowakowscy) is a Polish-language surname. Derived from place names such as Nowakowo, it is related to the surnames Nowak and Nowakowicz.

People
 Anton Nowakowski (1897–1969), German organist and composer
 Bożena Nowakowska (born 1955), Polish hurdler
 Emil Nowakowski (born 1974) Polish football midfielder
 Ida Nowakowska, Polish-American actress and singer
 Jan Nowakowski (born 1994), Polish volleyball player
 Karolina Nowakowska (born 1982), Polish actress
 Krystyna Nowakowska (1935–2019), Polish athlete
 Maria Nowakowska (born 1987), Polish beauty pageant
 Piotr Nowakowski (born 1987), Polish volleyball player
 Pola Nowakowska (born 1996), Polish volleyball player
 Richard Nowakowski (born 1955), retired Polish-German boxer
 Waldemar Nowakowski (born 1950), Polish politician
 Weronika Nowakowska-Ziemniak (born 1986), Polish biathlete
 Zofia Nowakowska (born 1988), Polish singer
 Aleksandr Yakovlevich Novakovsky, birth name of Alexander Nove, British economist

See also
 
 
 Novakovic

References

Powell, Kimberley. "Last Name: Nowakowski." The Internet Surname Database. About.com, 2003. Web. 10 Sept. 2014.

Polish-language surnames